Cengiz Coşkun (born 29 April 1982) is a Turkish television and film actor. He is best known for his role as Turgut Alp in the TV show Diriliş: Ertuğrul.

Early life 
Coşkun was born on 29 April 1982 in Istanbul. His mother is a housewife and his father is a machine technician, they were ethnic Turks from Bulgaria who immigrated to Turkey.

Career  
He started playing basketball in the first years of secondary school, and then won Ülkerspor's auditions. He played there for 7 years, then transferred to Erdemir Ereğli Spor where he remained for 2 years. Then he played for 1 year at Balıkesir DSİ Spor. In 2008, he graduated from Marmara University, sports department.

During this time he also started modelling. Coşkun began his appearing and modelling profession after successful a modelling contest in 2002, which was held in London. In 2005, he started acting with the series Rüzgarlı Bahçe. After starting acting, he got training from Şahika Tekand and joined her workshops. Later, he appeared in the series Candan Öte (2006), Doktorlar (2007) and Hicran Yarası (2009).

Coşkun made his film debut in the Fetih 1453 (2012) and appeared as Giovanni Giustiniani. It is said he did not get the main role as the Sultan as his eyes were blue. He competed in the reality show Survivor: Ünlüler vs. Gönüllüler 3 (2013) and was eliminated on the 94th day. He played the role of Turgut Alp in Diriliş: Ertuğrul (2014). In 2020, Coşkun appeared in film Malazgirt 1071 in lead role of Seljuk Sultan Alp Arslan.

Filmography

TV series

Films

References

External links
 
 

Living people
1982 births
21st-century Turkish male actors
Male actors from Istanbul
Ülker G.S.K. basketball players
Marmara University alumni
Bulgarian Turks in Turkey
Turkish male models
Turkish male film actors
Turkish male television actors